is a fictional boxer from Nintendo's Punch-Out!! series. King Hippo first appeared on the Nintendo Entertainment System game Mike Tyson's Punch-Out!!, as the second competitor in the Major Circuit. Subsequent reviews have characterized King Hippo as one of the most iconic characters from the game. The character is featured prominently on the NBC Saturday morning cartoon, Captain N: The Game Master. His obese figure and his face both resemble those of a hippopotamus.

Overview
King Hippo was originally created by Punch-Out!! character designer Makoto Wada. His appearance in Punch-Out!! for the Wii was illustrated by art director Eddie Visser. King Hippo's face and girth resemble that of a hippopotamus, hence his name. He is an obese man from the fictional Hippo Island which is located somewhere in the South Pacific. His age, weight, and height are all unknown. He is often depicted wearing a crown and has tanned skin, however in his Captain N: The Game Master appearance he is blue, there it is interpreted by Garry Chalk. His fighting style consists of guarding his belly, and his guard only drops if hit in the mouth, revealing his weak spot. If he is hit in the stomach, he drops his trunks. The Wii version features a second mode where King Hippo has duct-taped a manhole cover over his stomach to protect himself; the player must knock it loose in order to attack that weak point.

Promotional merchandise was created for the Wii Punch-Out!!, which included replicas of King Hippo's crown and boxer shorts, as well as a King Hippo desktop punching bag.

Appearances
King Hippo first appeared in the 1987 NES video game Punch-Out!!. He returned in 2009 for the Wii video game of the same name (voiced by Scott McFadyen). Some advertisements for the Wii game feature the protagonist Little Mac training to reclaim the World Circuit Title from King Hippo. A scrapped commercial for Punch-Out!! on Wii depicted King Hippo showing off his home in an "MTV Cribs-like tour" in a place called Strong Island. King Hippo appears in Super Smash Bros. for Wii U as a collectible trophy, based on his appearance in Punch-Out!! for Wii. He later appears as a Spirit in Super Smash Bros. Ultimate, a collectible, wearable object that modifies the wearer's stats and/or abilities.

King Hippo has a major role in the animated series Captain N: The Game Master voiced by Garry Chalk as one of Mother Brain's henchmen. He has blue skin and is often paired in a comedic duo with the Kid Icarus villain Eggplant Wizard. This version of King Hippo also appears in the comic books based on the series. He makes a cameo appearance in the Scott Pilgrim & the Infinite Sadness comic book, as part of a guest comic written and illustrated by Girly creator Jackie Lesnick.

Reception
Since appearing in the NES video game Punch-Out!!, King Hippo has received positive reception. IGN editor Lucas M. Thomas stated that despite his exclusion from some Punch-Out!! titles, he is still popular among fans due to his role in the NES game and the Captain N: The Game Master cartoon. Destructoids Colette Bennett called King Hippo distinctive and well-designed. GameDaily listed him as the 10th best Nintendo character ever, stating that he "stands out" more than the other boxers in the series, including the player-character. GamesRadar's Chris Antista made a similar comment, stating that he was more memorable and significant in the NES Punch-Out!! than all of the other characters. He also called his role in Captain N: The Game Master King Hippo's greatest achievement. Kotaku writer Kevin Wong listed King Hippo as his third favorite boxer in the Punch-Out!! series. He praised his "completely unique" design as a "stroke of brilliance" by Nintendo. He also stated that the tension of having to counterattack King Hippo to win as another aspect of why he ranked so high. 

Nintendo World Report writer Justin Berube listed King Hippo as one of the most deserving characters to be playable in Super Smash Bros. Ultimate. He cited both his desire to see Little Mac have an antagonist to fight as well as how memorable King Hippo was to him. An editor for Wired called King Hippo his favorite opponent in the NES Punch-Out!! and discussed how his kids would punch him in the gut as if he was King Hippo. IGN listed King Hippo as the 64th best video game villain, though they describe him as a "push-over" in the NES Punch-Out!!. King Hippo's race and weight have been the subject of discussion. The Retronauts podcast discussed how he was a stereotype of Pacific islanders, pointing to King Hippo being fat and lavish as examples of these stereotypes. 

Brian Shirk, writing in Bit Mob, criticized King Hippo's design as offensive, suggesting that his "subhuman caricature" design was likely based on the savage portrayal of Polynesians in media. In an article about the need for more positive non-white characters in Nintendo games, Ars Technica writer Sam Machkovech compared King Hippo's face to Donkey Kong's. Comics Beat writer Davey Nieves referred to King Hippo as the game's "body shaming mascot" and stated that he would have not survived past 25 years of age. The Outline writer Anshuman Iddamsetty discussed King Hippo in an article about video games "demonizing obesity," specifically citing the fact that his weakness was his belly.

Game Informer writes that the secret to defeating King Hippo was likely more well-known than the 30-life code in the video game Contra". Colette Bennett echoed sentiments of the notability of his weakness and said that "anyone could tell you King Hippo's weak point". 1UP.com editor Bob Mackey called the fight with him an "iconic moment in gaming" and one that was the "talk of the schoolyards during the 80's". Kotaku editor Owen Good mocked Chicago Bulls center Joakim Noah for not being able to get past King Hippo in the NES Punch-Out!! The method of defeating King Hippo has been used as a metaphor to refer to both literal and figurative gut punches.

Notes

References

Fictional professional boxers
Fictional martial artists in video games
Male characters in video games
Male video game villains
Nintendo antagonists
Punch-Out!! characters
Video game bosses
Video game characters introduced in 1987
Fictional boxers